Sybille Gruner (born 18 May 1969) was a member of the German women's national handball team between 1989 and 1995. In 1993 the team won the world championships in a very close game against Denmark. One year later, during the European championship final in Berlin, they played the Danish team again and lost.

At the Olympic Games in Barcelona in 1992 the team had high hopes of a medal but placed a disappointing fourth.  In the play-off for the bronze medal they lost against the odds-on favourite, Russia.

Sybille was born in Erfurt in East Germany.  She attended Kinder- und Jugendsportschule in Leipzig, a special school for athletically talented children. At the age of 16 she was a member of the senior SC Leipzig team that won the European cup. Several national titles with SC Leipzig followed.

In 1990 she moved to Leverkusen and played for Bayer 04 Leverkusen for the next 12 years. After the birth of her first daughter and winning the national cup she finished her active career as a handball player. For the next 3 years she worked as co-trainer and, after the birth of her second daughter in 2004, she returned for another year to the coaching bench.

Since 2006 she has been working for TNT Innight. She married the former basketball player Bodo Kuczmann in 2004.

References 
 Profile at sports-reference.com

1969 births
Living people
Sportspeople from Erfurt
People from Bezirk Erfurt
German female handball players
Olympic handball players of Germany
Handball players at the 1992 Summer Olympics
20th-century German women